The 1989 Iowa State Cyclones football team represented Iowa State University during the 1989 NCAA Division I-A football season.  They played their home games at Cyclone Stadium in Ames, Iowa. They participated as members of the Big Eight Conference.  The team was coached by head coach Jim Walden. This was also the first time Iowa State played against Minnesota in 65 years. On October 6, 1923, Jack Trice, an Iowa State athlete and one of the first college football players to be African-American, died after suffering injuries in a Minnesota game. There was speculation that the injuries caused by the Minnesota players were intentional. Because of this, Iowa State did not renew their contract to play with Minnesota until the 1989 season.

Schedule

References

Iowa State
Iowa State Cyclones football seasons
Iowa State Cyclones football